Bytkiv is an urban-type settlement in Nadvirna Raion in Ivano-Frankivsk Oblast. It belongs to Pasichna rural hromada, one of the hromadas of Ukraine.

Location 
Bytkiv is located 12 kilometers west of Nadvirna between the Bystrytsia of Nadvirna and the Bystrytsia of Solotvyn Rivers in the northeastern part of the Gorgany mountain range.

History 
Between 1772 and 1918 it was part of Austrian Galicia. After the end of World War I Bytkiv became part of  Nadvirna Powiat in Stanisławów Voivodeship, part of Poland. In 1939 it was annexed by the Soviet Union. In 1940 it became an urban-type settlement.

Bitkiv was occupied by German troops during World War II from 1941 to 1944, part of the District of Galicia.

Since 2015, the head of the village council has been Vasyl Yosypovych Vintonyak.

Economy 
Oil and gas deposits are located in the area of Bytkiv. Since the end of the 19th century, oil has been produced in the settlement, with production peaking in 1925. During the 1920s and the 1930s, Bytkiv was the largest Galician oil producer after Boryslav.

Education 
Bytkiv has one school serving all education levels and two 1st level schools.

Notable people
 Bohdan Beniuk, actor
 Roman Dytko, footballer
 Mykola Hobdych, choral conductor
 Roman Maksymyuk, footballer

References 

Urban-type settlements in Nadvirna Raion
Nadvirna Raion